Shpend is an Albanian masculine given name and may refer to:
Shpend Ahmeti (born 1978), Kosovar politician
Shpend Dragobia (1853–1918), Albanian soldier and revolutionary
Shpend Hasani (born 1996), German footballer 

Albanian masculine given names